Fano is a parish of the municipality of Gijón / Xixón, in Asturias, Spain. In 2012, its population was 220. Located in the south-east of the municipality, Fano is a rural area which borders the municipality of Siero in the south, and with the district of Valdornón in the east.

Toponym comes from Latin Fanum, a kind of temples ancient romans built in pre-Roman cults sacred places. A Benedictine monastery existed in Fano from 12th to 17th centuries. Its front romanesque façade is nowadays part of the San Juan Evangelista de Fano church.

Villages and their neighbourhoods
Carceo
Cadianes
Carbonero
La Cuadra
La Bustia
Llagarón
Fano
La Malata
El Regatu
La Zurraquera
Zalce
El Caleyu
Llongares
El Piñíu
Viesques

Notes

External links
 Official Toponyms - Principality of Asturias website.
 Official Toponyms: Laws - BOPA Nº 229 - Martes, 3 de octubre de 2006 & ''DECRETO 105/2006, de 20 de septiembre, por el que se determinan los topónimos oficiales del concejo de Gijón."

Parishes in Gijón